Astyanax Saunders Douglass (September 19, 1897 – January 26, 1975) was a Major League Baseball catcher. He played for the Cincinnati Reds in 1921 and 1925.

Born in Covington, Texas, Douglass attended Texas Christian University (TCU), where he played college baseball and college football. He died in 1975 in El Paso, Texas of a cardiac arrest.

References

External links

 

1897 births
1975 deaths
American football centers
Major League Baseball catchers
Cincinnati Reds players
TCU Horned Frogs baseball players
TCU Horned Frogs football players
People from Hill County, Texas
Players of American football from Texas
Baseball players from Texas